The T.J. Jones Apartments in Boise, Idaho, is a 2-story, brick and stone building originally designed in 1904 by Tourtellotte & Co. and expanded in 1911 by Tourtellotte and Hummel. The structure features a prominent Queen Anne corner turret, but Renaissance Revival characteristics also were discovered in preparation for adding the building to the National Register of Historic Places in 1982.

The original design included 12 2-story apartments, and after the building was expanded in 1911, it contained 17 2-story apartments. The foundation and load bearing walls were designed for a 4-story building to be completed at a future date, but the building has remained a 2-story structure.

Thomas J. Jones
Thomas J. Jones was an attorney who moved from Nebraska and settled in Boise City in 1890. Jones was active in the local populist movement, and he owned mining interests in Idaho.

See also
Friedline Apartments

References

External links

National Register of Historic Places in Boise, Idaho
Renaissance Revival architecture in Idaho
Residential buildings completed in 1904
Apartment buildings in Boise, Idaho
Apartment buildings on the National Register of Historic Places in Idaho